The List of the People was a loose coalition of independent candidates that was created in Chile to participate in the 2021 elections for members of the Constitutional Convention. Despite its success in the May 2021 elections, a series of scandals made most of its members have leave the coalition since then. In the Constitutional Convention many of its former members continue to collaborate as part of the "Pueblo Constituyente" group. 

The pact intented to represent the people that protested in the Estallido social, the civil unrest that started the process to create a new Constitution. Some of the policies agreed between the candidates participating in the list is the commitment to an "environmental, egalitarian and participatory state", the end to the current private pension system, rejection of the TPP-11 and "end to the exploitation of the environment." The coalition was anti-establishment and anti-elitist, especially regarding the right-wing government of Sebastián Piñera and its political allies. The group had also manifested their intention to hold popular assemblies for the decisions their members will present in the Constitutional Convention.

The List of the People was one of the surprises of the election, obtaining the third largest number of votes and 27 seats, surpassing even the Constituent Unity, the main centre-left alliance.

Composition 
Due to the electoral system, different lists were presented to the election; some included the name "List of the People" or a variation, while others had different names. The lists considered as part of The List of the People on a national level were:

 E. Pueblo Unido Tarapacá
 G. Insulares e Independientes
 J. Elige La Lista del Pueblo
 N. La Lista del Pueblo Distrito 9
 Q. Lista del Pueblo Transformando desde el Willi
 S. Independientes Distrito 6 + Lista del Pueblo
 WD. Movimiento Territorial Constituyente
 WJ. Asamblea Constituyente Atacama
 XC. A Pulso, por el buen vivir
 XD. Lista del Pueblo - Ríos Independientes
 XJ. Fuerza Social de Ñuble, La Lista del Pueblo
 XT. Movimiento Social Constituyente / La Lista del Pueblo
 YL. La Lista del Pueblo Distrito 12
 YP. La Lista del Pueblo 100% Independiente
 ZD. La Lista del Pueblo Maule Sur
 ZE. Movimiento Social La Lista del Pueblo
 ZI. Coordinadora Social de Magallanes
 ZN. La Lista del Pueblo

References

External links
Official site

 
2020 establishments in Chile
2022 disestablishments in Chile
Political parties disestablished in 2022
Political parties established in 2020